Damir Vučko (born 24 April 1990) was a Croatian handball player. He played for RK Buzet.

Vučko played for RK Zamet from 2007 to 2015. He didn't win any trophies with the club but he did reach the final of the Croatian Cup  in 2012. The same year he participated in the EHF Cup with the club.

He also played for the youth national team for 2 years. With the team he won the IHF Men's Youth World Championship in 2009.

On June 17, 2017, Vučko appeared in the 60 anniversary match for RK Zamet. After the match it was announced that he would come out of retirement and play for the senior team.

Honours
Zamet
Croatian Cup
Finalist: 2012

Individual
Dražen Petrović Award - 2009

External links
European stats
Premier League stats

References

1990 births
Living people
Croatian male handball players
Handball players from Rijeka
RK Zamet players